National Route 295 is a national highway of Japan connecting Narita International Airport and Narita, Chiba in Japan, with a total length of 5.8 km (3.6 mi).

References

National highways in Japan
Roads in Chiba Prefecture